Nan Tharat (died 1698) was a king of Lan Xang who ruled between 1696 to 1698.

Nan Tharat was a cousin of Sourigna Vongsa, he was the governor of Sikhottabong. On the death of Sourigna Vongsa, he briefly seized the throne from Tian Thala. He was overthrown by Xai Ong Ve in 1698 and executed.

References

Kings of Lan Xang
1698 deaths
17th-century Laotian people